Oui Oui Si Si Ja Ja Da Da is the tenth studio album by the British band Madness, released on their own Lucky 7 Records label through Cooking Vinyl in the United Kingdom on 29 October 2012 and in the United States on 13 November 2012. The album does not feature founding member and bassist Mark Bedford, who was on hiatus from the band at the time. The album cover is by Peter Blake and features rejected titles for the album crossed out. The album was preceded by a 'teaser' song, "Death of a Rude Boy", available as a digital download from 12 August 2012 (along with a remix by Andrew Weatherall).

Oui Oui Si Si Ja Ja Da Da debuted at number No. 10 in the UK Albums Chart on 4 November 2012, becoming Madness' seventh studio album out of ten to reach the top 10 in the UK. It received favourable reviews in Q, Mojo, The Arts Desk and London evening newspaper Evening Standard amongst others, the notable exception being a poor review in the NME.

Critical reception

The review aggregating website Metacritic gave Oui Oui Si Si Ja Ja Da Da a "generally favorable" rating of 71% based on eight reviews. Among the most positive reviews were those from AllMusic and Metro, giving the album 4 stars out of 5. AllMusic called the album a "mini latter-day gem," while Metro wrote, "If you wondered if this could be a classic Madness album, the answer's in the affirmative." AllMusic described the album as a "clever and confident collection of savvy pop and ska, tunes that are effervescently melodic, lyrically nimble, and giddy with their dexterity." 

Rating it 3 stars out of 5, the Daily Express called it a "rather good new album" that "may lack a little of the energy of the early albums." The Punknews.org website gave it 3½ stars out of 5, writing that it is "a perfect example of the band's ability to mix a wide array of styles held together by ska and reggae rhythms." They added, "Oui Oui Si Si Ja Ja Da Da isn't a perfect Madness album, but it is indeed a solid and fun listen." In a 1-star review in the NME, the reviewer felt that Madness is "half-arseing" their way through "a thick slurry of clod-hopping ska-by-numbers," and that it is "time to hang it up for good."

Singles
The first single from the album – "My Girl 2" – was released in September 2012.

"Never Knew Your Name" was the second single off the album, released in January 2013. It became their biggest airplay hit since 1999's Top 10 hit "Lovestruck", reaching the UK Airplay Chart Top 25 and No. 88 in the UK Singles Chart. After the song was performed on The Jonathan Ross Show on 19 January, the album re-entered the UK Album Top 75 at No. 16 on 27 January.

On 22 February 2013, radio DJ Chris Evans played "How Can I Tell You", the third single from the album, during his Breakfast Show on which lead singer Suggs was his guest. The single was released on Monday 8 April on iTunes with an extra live version and a demo version by second singer Cathal Smyth.

The fourth single off the album – "Misery" – was released in July 2013.

Deluxe 3-CD version
Guitar player Chris Foreman mentioned a planned box set version of the album, expected to be released in May 2013. On 28 February 2013, it was revealed that the album would be re-released in a deluxe version, with an extra CD containing 20 songs, including various original tracks not included on the album, a series of band demos and remixes and a John Lennon cover. This second CD's demo versions do not all feature Suggs on vocals, with "Black and Blue", "My Girl 2" and "Never Knew Your Name" having Mike Barson on vocals, "Death of a Rude Boy", "Misery" and "So Alive" featuring Cathal Smyth, and "Rules of Deolali" and "Check Mate La Luna" being instrumentals. The final demo, "I Got You (Kitchen Floor)" features Daniel Woodgate's brother Nick on vocals and a variety of instruments instead of regular band members. A DVD of the band's performance of the album at the Butlins "House of Fun" Weekender from 2011, along with a live CD of the following year's gig is also included. The latter CD also features Foreman's karaoke version of the Beastie Boys' "(You Gotta) Fight for Your Right (To Party!)" and Ian Dury's "Sex & Drugs & Rock & Roll".

The deluxe version features new artwork, featuring the band in various fancy dress costumes representing the different rejected titles for the album, in a similar vein to the cover of their The Rise & Fall album from 1982.

Track listing

Note that tracks 12-14 appear on all versions of the album, but are nonetheless promoted as bonus tracks.

2013 deluxe edition
Disc 1 – Oui Oui Si Si Ja Ja Da Da
The first disc contains the fourteen tracks from the original album.

Disc 2 – Bonus tracks +

Disc 3 – Live from the House of Fun Weekender November 23rd 2012
Recorded live at Butlin's Minehead, Minehead, Somerset, England.

DVD disc 4 – Live from the House of Fun Weekender November 25th 2011
Filmed live at Butlin's Minehead, Minehead, Somerset, England.

Chart positions

Certifications and sales

Personnel
Credits are adapted from the album's liner notes.

Madness
 Graham "Suggs" McPherson 
 Cathal Smyth  
 Mike Barson  
 Chris Foreman 
 Lee Thompson  
 Daniel Woodgate 

Additional personnel
 Bass – Graham Bush    
 Brass – Mike Kearsey, Joe Auckland, Steve Turner
 Percussion – Charlie Andrew (2, 4, 11, 13, 14), Lenny Edwards (5, 6, 8, 9), Spider L (1) 
 Backing vocals – Charlie Andrew (7, 10, 14), James Porter (6, 9), Chris Schrier (6, 9), Frank Marshall (6, 9), Bob Walker (6, 9), Vanessa Contenay-Quinones (12, 14), Siobhan Fitzpatrick (10), Spider L (1), John Avila (3), Ray Suen (3)
 Trumpet – Brad Magers (3), Keith Douglas (3), Joe Auckland (10) 
 Guitar – Joby Ford (3)
 Guitar andjarana – Ray Suen (3) 
 Guitarron – Vincent Hidalgo (3) 
 Cocktail drum kit – Jorma Vik (3)
 Melodica – Seamus Beaghen (11)
 Programming – Daniel Woodgate (10)
 Violin – Kirsty Mangan (5, 8, 10), Stephanie Benedetti (5, 8), Ellie Fagg (5, 8), Vicky Lyon (5, 8), Martin Lissola (5, 8), Amyn Merchant (7, 12), David Juritz (7, 12), Julian Leaper (7, 12), Yuri Kalnits (7, 12), Kerenza Peacock (2), Hayley Pomfrett (2), Jenny Sacha (2), Deborah Widdup (2), Anna Croad (2), Ray Suen [3]
 Viola – Natalie Holt (5, 8), Nick Barr (5, 8), Garfield Jackson (7, 12), Jon Thorn (7, 12), Emma Owens (2), Simon Tandree (2)
 Cello – Rachael Lander (5, 8), Nick Cooper (7, 12), Tim Gill (7, 12), Rosie Danvers (2)  
 Harp – Camilla Pay (2) 
 Brass arrangements – Madness, Mike Kearsey 
 String arrangements – Daniel Woodgate (5, 7, 8), Mike Kearsey (5, 8), Simon Hale (12), Rosie Danvers (2), Kirsty Mangan (7), Mike Barson (5)    
 Mariachi trumpet and string arrangements – William V. Malpede, John Avila (3) 
 Strings conductor – Mike Kearsey (5, 8), Simon Hale (7, 12)

Technical personnel
 Cenzo Townshend – mixing (1, 2, 4, 6, 9, 11)
 Charlie Andrew – pre-production (2, 4, 5, 6, 8, 9, 11)
 Owen Morris – vocal production (3)
 Peter Blake – cover art
 Tony McGee – photography
 Luke Insect – design

Deluxe edition 
 Mark Bedford – bass (2, 5) 
 Baluji Shrivastav – sitar (2) 
 Mike Kearsey, Joe Auckland, Steve Turner, Steve Hamilton – brass (3-9) 
 Simon Hale, Julian Leaper, Amyn Merchant – string arrangements and conductors (11) 
 Nick Woodgate – vocals, piano, keyboards, guitar (15) 
 Daniel Woodgate – drums, programming (15) 
 Michael McEvoy – bass (15)
 Charlie Brown, Sali-Wyn Ryan, Sarah Chapman, Nerys Richards – strings (15)
 Charlie Andrew – pre-production and additional tracking (2, 9), mixing (8)
 Louis Henry Sarmiento II – additional tracking (2)
 Anthony Leung – mixing (3-7, 10, 11), additional tracking (3, 4, 6, 7, 10), recording (5), additional recording (11), mixing (disc 3)
 Madness – mixing, recording (5)
 Clive Langer – mixing (8)
 John Avila – additional tracking (9)
 Peter Miles – audio mixing (DVD)
 John Davies – mastering
 Peter Blake – album title text
 Paul Agar – design, layout
 Perou – photography

References

External links

2012 albums
Madness (band) albums
Lucky 7 Records albums
Albums produced by Clive Langer
Albums produced by Stephen Street
Albums produced by Owen Morris
Albums with cover art by Peter Blake (artist)